Abdul Raziq Achakzai, also known as General Raziq, (1979 – October 18, 2018) was the chief of police for Kandahar Province. Many Afghans regarded him as a national hero while others viewed him simply as a warlord. In late 2001, Achakzai became a member of Gul Agha Sherzai's forces whom the Taliban had surrendered to after the U.S. invasion of Afghanistan. Achakzai was considered to be one of the most powerful security officials in Afghanistan for the last few years of his life.

After surviving several assassination attempts over the years, Achakzai was killed in an insider attack by a bodyguard of the provincial governor, who opened fire on him and other security officials after a meeting with the U.S. Army General Scott Miller at the governor's compound in Kandahar. Achakzai was succeeded by his brother, Tadeen Khan, who has no military related experience. Tadeen's nomination was a result of heavy pressure from powerful tribal elders who pressured the Afghan government to overlook his lack of experience and training.

Personal life
Achakzai was born in 1979 in the town of Spin Boldak, Kandahar Province, where he was raised. He was a member of the Adozai sub-tribe of Achakzai. He and his family migrated to Pakistan after the Taliban took control of Afghanistan in 1994. The Taliban had killed his father and uncle. He returned to Afghanistan in the fall of 2001 and became a member of fighters loyal to Gul Agha Sherzai. Achakzai never went to school and he had three wives.

Achakzai is thought to have received annual kickbacks from customs revenues exacted at border crossings. He became extremely wealthy as a result of his control over the province and a major border thoroughfare. He also spent time in Dubai and had been heavily involved in horse trading. He also had businesses abroad.

Military career
In November 2001, Achakzai joined anti-Taliban forces that were led by Sherzai and Fida Mohammad. Instead of fighting, a peaceful transition of power took place in Kandahar between the Taliban and the other group. Although he was unknown in 2001, he gradually rose to command the Afghan Border Police on Afghanistan's border between Kandahar and Pakistan's Balochistan Province.

Human rights abuses
Achakzai was alleged to have committed numerous human right violations including extrajudicial killings, forced disappearances and torture in the Kandahar province. In 2017, the United Nations committee on torture wanted Achakzai to be prosecuted for allegations of torture and enforced disappearances. The committee also stated that Achakzai was 'operating secret detentions centers' where people were being tortured. Achakzai denied all the allegations made against him by the U.N. committee.
 
Apart from international human rights organizations, residents of Kandahar also accused him of being involved in human right violations. Some Tribal elders and provincial legislators expressed relief over his death. One legislator said that Kandahar province became less violent after his death.
 
For many years, former Afghan President Hamid Karzai and other powerful allies had refused to prosecute Achakzai due to lack of credible evidence.
 
In August 2011, the U.S. military banned the transfer of detainees to Afghan authorities in Kandahar. The military stated that they are investigating reports regarding abuse of prisoners by provincial police chief as they have received "credible allegations" that detainees are being mistreated while in the custody of Achakzai. Military spokesman, Col. Gary Kolb, said that the U.S. will not hand over detainees to Afghan officials until they are sure that there are no issues.

Alleged drug smuggling and corruption
Achakzai was also accused of being involved in drug smuggling and corruption cases. American officials have acknowledged in front of the members of U.S. Congress that Achakzai had made millions by collecting major cuts from all the trucks that pass through Spin Boldak crossing. Similarly Canadian Brig.Gen. Jonathan Vance, former commander of NATO-led forces, acknowledged that Achakzai was directly involved in drug smuggling.
 
Matthieu Aikins, in his investigative story in Harper's Magazine, stated that Achakzai made $5–6 million every month through drug smuggling.
 
In 2010, the head of Afghan customs revenue said that every year the Afghan government is receiving only a 'fifth of what the government should collect' in customs revenue from the Spin Boldak crossing. In 2015, a newspaper run by a group of Hazaras also reported that the Afghan government was only receiving 1/5th what it should be receiving from the customs border which was under the control of Abdul Raziq. Raziq maintained full control of Spin Boldak crossing until his death.

See also
Afghan National Police

References

1979 births
2018 deaths
Afghan military personnel
People from Kandahar Province
Pashtun people
Assassinated Afghan people
Afghan military officers